The Eurovision Young Dancers 1989 was the third edition of the Eurovision Young Dancers held at the Palais des Congrès in Paris, France on 28 June 1989. Organised by the European Broadcasting Union (EBU) and host broadcaster France Régions 3 (FR3), dancers from ten countries participated in the televised final. A total of seventeen countries took part in the competition.  and  made their debut at the contest.

The participant countries could send one or two dancers, male or female, that could not be older than 19. Each dancer was free to participate in any of these 2 categories: classical dancing or contemporary, modern or jazz dancing. The pas de deux performances could not be longer than ten minutes, while the variations could not be longer than five minutes. There were 4 awards that year: contemporary dancing prize, classical dancing prize and 2 jury's special prizes (for contemporary and classical dance).

Agnès Letestu of France won the contemporary dance prize, with Tetsuya Kumakawa of United Kingdom winning the classical ballet prize.

Location

The Palais des congrès de Paris, a concert venue, convention centre and shopping mall in the 17th arrondissement of Paris, France, was the host venue for the 1989 edition of the Eurovision Young Dancers.

The venue was built by French architect Guillaume Gillet, and was inaugurated in 1974. The venue hosted the Eurovision Song Contest 1978. Nearby the venue are Bois de Boulogne and the affluent neighbourhood of Neuilly-sur-Seine. The closest métro and RER stations are Porte Maillot and Neuilly – Porte Maillot, accessible via the lower levels of the building.

Format
The format consists of dancers who are non-professional and between the ages of 16–21, competing in a performance of dance routines of their choice, which they have prepared in advance of the competition. All the dancers then take part in a choreographed group dance during 'Young Dancers Week'.

Jury members of a professional aspect and representing the elements of ballet, contemporary, and modern dancing styles, score each of the competing individual and group dance routines. The overall winner upon completion of the final dances is chosen by the professional jury members.

The opening act was "Mon truc en plumes" performed by host Zizi Jeanmaire with her dancers and for the interval "Concerto en Ré" by L'École du Ballet de l'Ópera de Paris.

Results
Due to time restrictions, a semi-final was held to select the ten performers for the final.

Preliminary round
A total of sixteen countries took part in the preliminary semi-final round of the 1989 contest, of which ten qualified to the televised grand final. The following countries failed to qualify.

Final

Jury members
The jury members consisted of the following:

  – Roland Petit (Head of jury)
  – Frank Andersen
  – Paolo Bortoluzzi
  – Oscar Araiz
  – Igor Eisner
  – John Neumeier
  – Ekaterina Maximova
  – Heinz Spoerli
  – Vladimir Vasiliev

Broadcasting
The 1989 Young Dancers competition was broadcast in 20 countries including Jordan and Bulgaria.

See also
 Eurovision Song Contest 1989

References

External links 
 

Eurovision Young Dancers by year
1989 in France
June 1989 events in Europe
Events in Paris